This page lists the World Best Year Performances in the year 1981 in the Marathon for both men and women. Australia's Robert de Castella broke the world record on December 6, 1981, at the Fukuoka Marathon, clocking a total time of 2:08:18. In the men's competition there were two editions of the Tokyo International Marathon run in the same year; the first one was held on February 8, 1981, and the second one on March 1, 1981.

Men

Records

1981 World Year Ranking

Women

Records

1981 World Year Ranking

References
digilander.libero

External links
1981 Marathon Ranking by the ARRS

1981
 Marathon